Khirki Urqu (Quechua khirki armadillo, urqu mountain, "armadillo mountain", Hispanicized spelling Querque Orjo) is a mountain in the Wansu mountain range in the Andes of Peru, about   high. It is located in the Arequipa Region, La Unión Province, Huaynacotas District. Khirki Urqu lies southwest of Q'illu Urqu.

References 

Mountains of Peru
Mountains of Arequipa Region